The 1957 Omloop Het Volk was the 13th edition of the Omloop Het Volk cycle race and was held on 24 March 1957. The race started and finished in Ghent. The race was won by Norbert Kerckhove.

General classification

References

1957
Omloop Het Nieuwsblad
Omloop Het Nieuwsblad